Nina Nikolayevna Urgant (4 September 1929 – 3 December 2021) was a Soviet and Russian film and stage actress. She was granted the honor of People's Artist of the RSFSR in 1974.

Family 
 Father — Nikolay Andreevich Urgant, Estonian, People's Commissariat of Internal Affairs officer.
 Mother — Maria Petrovna Urgant, Ukrainian.
The family had four children: two brothers and two sisters.
 Her first husband — actor Lev Milinder 
 Son — actor Andrey Urgant 
 Grandson — TV presenter Ivan Urgant
 Great-granddaughter Nina 
 Great granddaughter Valeria
 Granddaughter, Maria, lives in the Netherlands,
 Great grandson Emir, lives in the Netherlands,
Second husband — actor Gennady Voropayev.
Third husband — choreographer Kirill Laskari.

Selected filmography
1954 — Tamer of Tigers as Olechka Mikhailova
 1955 — Twelfth Night as maidservant
1957 — Street Full of Surprises as resting in Peterhof park
 1958 — There Were Soldiers ... as Widow
 1959 — The Overcoat as lady of easy virtue
 1960 — Beware, grandma as Alexandra 
 1962 — Introduction to Life as Volodya's mother
 1963 — Meet Baluyev! as Dusya Baluyeva
 1964 — Mother and Stepmother as Katherina
 1965 — Sultry July as Barbara
 1966 — I Come from Childhood as Lucy
 1967 — Retribution as Sima Suvorova
 1967 — War under the Roofs as Anna Mikhailovna
 1970 — Belorussian Station as Raisa, former nurse
 1975 — Bonus as Dina
 1975 — For the Rest of His Life as Aunt Laundry
 1976 — Family Celebration Day as Daria Stepanovna
 1976 — Long, Long Business as Maria Ivanovna Stroganova, mother of Kirill
 1976 — Days of the Surgeon Mishkin as Marina Vasilievna, head physician
 1976 — Own Opinion as Olympiada
 1977 — Open Book as Tanya's Mother
 1978 — The Handsome Man as Apollinaria
 1980 — Family Circle as Medvedeva
 1981 — Girl and Grand as Marina's mother
 1982 —  Solar Wind as Lyubov Vasilievna
 1984 — Time for Rest from Saturday to Monday as ship passengers
 1985 — Sunday Dad as Nina Sergeevna
 1988 — Weekdays and Holidays of Serafima Glukina as Maria Grigoryevna
 2005 — Streets of Broken Lights 6 as Elena Petrovna
 2006 — Russian Money as Anfisa Tikhonova
 2008 — Asian as Oshkinchiha

References

External links
 

1929 births
2021 deaths
20th-century Russian actresses
21st-century Russian actresses
People from Luga, Leningrad Oblast
Honored Artists of the RSFSR
People's Artists of the RSFSR
Recipients of the Order "For Merit to the Fatherland", 3rd class
Recipients of the Order "For Merit to the Fatherland", 4th class
Recipients of the Order of Honour (Russia)
Recipients of the USSR State Prize
Russian film actresses
Russian stage actresses
Soviet film actresses
Soviet stage actresses